Harbans Bhalla  (7 May 1930 – 5 April 1993) was the author of Peelay Pattar, a long Urdu epic poem, a creation realized after 14 years of writing. He was a writer, poet, philosopher, and a scholar, who wrote in the Persian, Shahmukhi and Urdu languages.

Biography
Harbans Bhalla was born in Pasrur, now in the Sialkot District of Pakistan. To his mother's pride, he wrote his first story in the 7th standard; It was titled Meri Mehbooba. After the partition of India in 1947 he moved to Amritsar, India. Rather than having been inspired by other writers, Bhalla's works came organically from his feelings.  Bhalla had a unique writing style: for a given topic he wrote 20 – 1,000 verses and each started with the same word. He wrote more than 14 books which were written and published in several languages.

He penned an Urdu epic poem titled Peelay Pattar (meaning yellow leaves) with 70,000 verses. Peelay Pattar is originally written in Shahmukhi language which is a variant of the Perso-Arabic script used to write the Punjabi language. It took him 14 years (From 1978 to 1992 )to complete the work and he hoped that it would make the Limca Book of Records. The first of ten volumes of the work will be released at the Punjabi University on 7 May 2013, which is the 83rd anniversary of his birth.

One of his stories Tazaaka was selected for a Hindi film. He subsequently received offers for his works to be included in Indian movies, but he rejected the offers. His works were published in newspapers. During his lifetime he was considered a "lesser known figure in the literary circles of Gujarat," India. After suffering from cancer, he died on 5 April 1993.

Published works 
Some of his published works include: 
 Peelay Pattar (Punjabi)
 Rekha (Gujarati)
 Ik Lehar Du Pathar
 Jad Phul Khidey (Punjabi)
 Zhanjar Dharti Di (Punjabi)
 Kani Kani Chandani (Punjabi)
 Piase Rishtey (Punjabi)
 Nike Nike Ghungru (Punjabi)
 Nari Ba Roop (Sindhi)
 Pyarji Rah Anagee (Sindhi)
 Khoon Patthar Pyar ( Sindhi)
 Akinchan Sambandho, a novel With N. A. Vora

Poetic Journey
Harbans Bhalla is famous for his literary poetic work peele pattarwhich has almost 70,000 verses or rhythmic couplets. He took fourteen years to complete. Peelay Pattar is originally written in Shahmukhi language which is a variant of the Perso-Arabic script used to write the Punjabi language. It took him 14 years to complete the work and he hoped that it would make the Limca Book of Records.The first of ten volumes of the work will be released at the Punjabi University on 7 May 2013, which is the 83rd anniversary of his birth. 10 volumes of the magnum opus, “Peelay Pattar” was released at the 6th World Punjabi Conference by Punjab Vidhan Sabha speaker, Rana KP Singh.

Notes

References 

Urdu-language poets
Persian-language poets
Indian male poets
Punjabi-language poets
1930 births
1993 deaths
People from Sialkot District
20th-century Indian poets
20th-century Indian male writers